Christian Soucy (born September 14, 1970) is a Canadian former professional ice hockey goaltender. He appeared in one National Hockey League game with the Chicago Blackhawks in the 1993–94 NHL season.

Biography
Soucy was born in Gatineau, Quebec. As a youth, he played in the 1983 Quebec International Pee-Wee Hockey Tournament with a minor ice hockey team from Gatineau.

Soucy joined the Blackhawks after two years playing for the University of Vermont men's hockey team where he ranks fifth all-time in save percentage (.908) and fifth all-time in goals against average (2.99). He appeared in three minutes of one National Hockey League game with the Chicago Blackhawks in the 1993–94 NHL season. Soucy did not face a shot during that brief appearance. Soucy's record was surpassed by Jorge Alves on December 31, 2016, who played 7.6 seconds in his only NHL game.

Throughout his 10-year career, Soucy played in various minor leagues, including the International Hockey League, American Hockey League, East Coast Hockey League, and Central Hockey League, among others.

Awards and honours

See also
List of players who played only one game in the NHL

References

External links

Christian Soucy @ hockeygoalies.org

1970 births
Anchorage Aces players
Arkansas Glaciercats players
Austin Ice Bats players
Baton Rouge Kingfish players
Canadian ice hockey goaltenders
Chicago Blackhawks players
Elmira Jackals (UHL) players
Fort Worth Fire players
French Quebecers
Houston Aeros (1994–2013) players
Indianapolis Ice players
Jacksonville Lizard Kings players
Kentucky Thoroughblades players
Living people
Louisville Panthers players
Tucson Gila Monsters players
Undrafted National Hockey League players
Vermont Catamounts men's ice hockey players
Ice hockey people from Gatineau
Canadian expatriate ice hockey players in the United States
AHCA Division I men's ice hockey All-Americans